Robin Arthur Anthony van Helden (born February 6, 1965 in Dordrecht, South Holland) is a retired middle-distance runner from the Netherlands, who represented his native country at two consecutive Summer Olympics, starting in 1988.

Robin attending Louisiana State University and ran track and field for the LSU Tigers.  He holds the LSU men's outdoor record in the 800 meters with a time of 1:45.53 (1987).

References
  Dutch Olympic Committee

1965 births
Living people
Dutch male middle-distance runners
Olympic athletes of the Netherlands
Sportspeople from Dordrecht
Athletes (track and field) at the 1988 Summer Olympics
Athletes (track and field) at the 1992 Summer Olympics
LSU Tigers track and field athletes